Afrocyclops is a genus of copepod crustaceans in the family Cyclopidae, containing the following species:
Afrocyclops alter Kiefer, 1935
Afrocyclops curticornis (Kiefer, 1932)
Afrocyclops doryphorus Kiefer, 1935
Afrocyclops gibsoni (Brady, 1904)
Afrocyclops herringi Alekseev & Sanoamuang, 2006
Afrocyclops ikennus Onabamiro, 1957
Afrocyclops lanceolatus Kiefer, 1935
Afrocyclops nubicus (Chappuis, 1922)
Afrocyclops pauliani Lindberg, 1951
Afrocyclops propinquus (Kiefer, 1932)
Afrocyclops sparus Dussart, 1974

References

External links

Cyclopidae
Cyclopoida genera
Taxonomy articles created by Polbot